was an Edo period Japanese samurai, and the 6th daimyō  of Kaga Domain in the Hokuriku region of Japan. He was the 7th hereditary chieftain of the Kanazawa Maeda clan. 

Munetoki was born in Kanazawa as the eldest son of Maeda Yoshinori. His mother was a concubine. From 1725, he was given the childhood name of Matsudaira Katsu-maru (勝丸) later Matsudaira Inuchiyo (犬千代). He was sent to Edo in 1736, receiving the name of Maeda Toshikatsu (利勝), and the courtesy titles of Sado-no-kami and Sakonoe-shosho and court rank of Senior 4th Grade, lower rank. He was received in formal audience by Shōgun Tokugawa Yoshimune in 1737, who granted him a kanji from his name, which thus became Maeda Munetoki. In 1744, he was wed to a daughter of  Matsudaira Masakata of Aizu Domain. In 1745, on his father’s death, he became daimyō and his titles were changed to Kaga-no-kami and Sakonoe-chusho. However, later the same year, his wife died in childbirth, and he followed less than a month later at the age of 21.

Kaga Domain passed to his younger brother Shigehiro.

Family
Father: Maeda Yoshinori
 Mother: Atae no Kata later Joshuin
 Wife: Matsudaira Tsunehime (d.1745), daughter of Matsudaira Masakata of Aizu Domain
 Child: Son (1745)

References 
Papinot, Edmond. (1948). Historical and Geographical Dictionary of Japan. New York: Overbeck Co.

External links
Kaga Domain on "Edo 300 HTML" (3 November 2007) 

1725 births
1747 deaths
People of Edo-period Japan
Maeda clan
Tozama daimyo